Time Does Not Heal is the fourth and final studio album by Dark Angel, released in 1991. This was Dark Angel's final album before their break up in 1992. Work on a follow-up album, under the name Atrocity Exhibition, was prepared, but never advanced past a few demos. Time Does Not Heal was also Dark Angel's only album with former Viking guitarist Brett Eriksen, who replaced Jim Durkin two years earlier.

Album content
Time Does Not Heal finds Dark Angel continuing the experimentation of its predecessor, Leave Scars (1989), introducing elements of technical and progressive, otherwise known as "technical thrash metal". It includes songs that are more than five minutes in length, odd time signatures and more complexity; similar to its predecessor, Time Does Not Heal abandoned the occult-related themes of their first two albums in favor of lyrics about social issues such as psychology and apathy.

When the album was released, it came with a sticker, reading "9 songs, 67 minutes, 246 riffs!", a claim later verified by drummer Gene Hoglan.

Reception

Time Does Not Heal received a positive review from AllMusic's Eduardo Rivadavia, who gave the album a rating of four out of five, and called it "a veritable masterpiece of thinking-man's thrash metal." He continued: "With this true colossus of a record, the thrash stalwarts provided what many consider to be the definitive statement in progressive thrash metal. Just imagine what ...And Justice for All would have sounded like if Metallica had recorded it with the attitude of Kill 'Em All, and you'll get the picture. Led by drummer, lyricist, sometime guitarist, and principal songwriter Gene Hoglan, the L.A. quintet packed more riffs (246 total, according to enthusiastic press releases of the time) into this ambitious, long-running disc, than most of their Bay Area neighbors had managed in their entire careers." Rivadavia also described Time Does Not Heal as "amazingly brutal thrash metal album", and concluded that "its sound brought into crisp focus by Pantera and Soundgarden producer Terry Date in ways never achieved on the band's ill-recorded earlier efforts."

Track listing

Credits
Ron Rinehart - Vocals
Eric Meyer - Guitars
Brett Eriksen - Guitars
Mike Gonzalez - Bass
Gene Hoglan - Drums, Guitars

References

Dark Angel (band) albums
1991 albums
Combat Records albums
Albums produced by Terry Date